Euphydryas sibirica is a butterfly of the family Nymphalidae. It is found in north-eastern Asia, where it is found in steppe or steppe-like meadows.

Adults are on wing from June to July.

The larvae of subspecies eothena feed on Scabiosa lachnophylla.

Subspecies
Euphydryas sibirica sibirica (Transbaikalia)
Euphydryas sibirica eothena (Röber, 1926) (Amur, Ussuri)
Euphydryas sibirica davidi (Oberthür, 1881) (northern China, Tuva, Mongolia) - David's checkerspot
Euphydryas sibirica tenebricosa (Bang-Haas, 1927) (China: Gansu)
Euphydryas sibirica phyllis Hemming, 1941 (North Korea)

References

Butterflies described in 1871
Euphydryas
Butterflies of Asia
Taxa named by Otto Staudinger